Bordes d'Envalira  is a village in Andorra, located in the parish of Canillo.

References

Populated places in Andorra
Canillo